Jose Landa-Rodriguez, also known as "Fox" and "Fox Tapia", is an alleged leader of the Mexican Mafia who is alleged to have run Mexican Mafia operations from inside Los Angeles County jails from 2012–2016. The alleged actions are purported in a May 2018 federal indictment and by prosecutors to have occurred primarily at the Men's Central Jail, a Los Angeles County Sheriff's Department county jail. It is alleged that Landa-Rodriguez had ordered murders and assaults to occur, for a kidnapping and murder to occur, and that he controlled all drug trafficking in Los Angeles County jails. 

In addition to charges accusing Landa-Rodriguez of controlling illegal operations within the Los Angeles County jail system, he has been accused of using his attorney, Gabriel Zendejas-Chavez, to relay message to Mexican Mafia gang members outside of the jail. Attorney Gabriel Zendejas-Chavez was arrested on May 23, 2018 in conjunction with the allegations of acting as a messenger.

Landa-Rodriguez is originally from the Mexican state Michoacán. Gang experts have described him as "the most powerful and influential inmate in L.A. County Jail".

References

Further reading

External links
 
 

Hispanic and Latino American gangsters
Mexican gangsters
Gangsters from Los Angeles
Mexican Mafia
Gang members
Prisoners and detainees of California
People from Michoacán
Mexican emigrants to the United States